Nude calendars are a type of wall calendar that feature nude models in a variety of scenes and locations. Predominantly in the United Kingdom, nude calendars are produced to raise money for charity.

Types

Calendars featuring pin-up models 

Commercial advertising on calendars started in the late 19th century and has often been linked to pictures or photographs of pin-up models. The products being advertised may be incorporated via product placement in the pictures themselves or separate via logos and corporate in-house style. Calendars featuring female nudes became a common feature in workplaces which were predominantly male (e.g. garages, car dealerships, etc.), although many employers have banned or restricted their display considering them a form of sex discrimination.

An example is the Pirelli Calendar.

Sports nude calendars 

Some sports teams have produced nude calendars, often to raise their profile or increase funding. Examples include the Australian women's football team prior to the 2000 Summer Olympics in Sydney, the Canadian cross-country ski team in 2001 and 2002, and a group of Canadian women biathletes in 2008.

Charity nude calendars 

The first nude charity calendar was made by a group of middle-aged Englishwomen, members of a local branch of the Women's Institute, who were posing nude to raise funds for Leukaemia Research. The calendar was released in 1999, and became an international sensation, and also inspired the movie Calendar Girls.  Following this lead, charity nude calendars proliferated in the 2000s. Proceeds usually go to various health or social causes. Participants may include artists, celebrities, sportsmen and sportswomen, firefighters, military forces, the police, or members of a group such as farmers, Women's Institute members who wish to raise funds for a chosen charity.

The women's rugby match Oxford and Cambridge, which was played at Twickenham in 2015, was publicised by the Oxford team making a nude calendar.

Successful charity nude calendars include:

  Rylstone Women's Institute 2000 Alternative WI Calendar, the first ever nude charity calendar
 Dieux du Stade (France)
 Men of the Long Tom Grange (United States) in aid of Junction City, Oregon public schools (2004-2006)
 League of Their Own (Australia) in aid of the Koori Kids Foundation (2006)
 Naked Rugby League (Australia) in aid of the National Breast Cancer Foundation of Australia (2007/2008)
 Naked For A Cause (Australia) in aid of breast cancer research (2008)
 Gods of Football (Australia) featuring Australian Football League and Australian Rugby League players in aid of the McGrath Foundation (2009)
 University of Warwick Boat Club (United Kingdom) in aid of Macmillan Cancer Support (2013)
 EastEnders (United Kingdom) featuring actors and actresses from the BBC TV show in aid of Children in Need (2015)
 The Magnet Tavern, in Lincolnshire (United Kingdom), in aid of the Air Ambulance (2016)

See also
 Depictions of nudity
 Fundraising
 Nude photography

References

External links 
 Warwick University Rowing Club's nude calendar
 Warwick Rowers men's calendar
 Naked Business: 9 Charity Calendars in the Nude
  - one of the most famous nude calendars in Poland - the Olmet calendar (Silesian Pirelli), 2019 edition